was a Japanese samurai of the late Edo period, who served the Makino clan of Nagaoka. Kawai was a senior military commander of Nagaoka forces during the Boshin War of 1868–1869. He escaped to nearby Aizu after his domain's fall; however, he contracted gangrene from an untreated leg wound, and died in Aizu.

References
Sasaki Suguru (2002). Boshin sensō: haisha no Meiji ishin. Tokyo: Chūōkōron-shinsha.

1827 births
1868 deaths
People of the Boshin War
Samurai
Karō
People from Nagaoka Domain
Deaths from gangrene
19th-century Japanese philosophers